The Chilean submarine Fresia was an H-class submarine of the Chilean Navy. The vessel was originally ordered by the United Kingdom's Royal Navy as HMS H20, but was handed over to Chile in 1917 as H6.

Description
Fresia was a single-hulled submarine, with a pressure hull divided into five watertight compartments. She displaced  on the surface and  submerged. The H-class submarines had a crew of 22 officers and enlisted men.

The submarine had two propellers, each of which was driven by a  diesel engine as well as a  electric motors. This arrangement gave Fresia a maximum speed of  while surfaced and  submerged. The H-class submarines were equipped with four  torpedo tubes in the bow and carried eight torpedoes.

Career 
H20 was a H-class submarine built by Fore River Yard of Quincy, Massachusetts. She was launched on 25 August 1915. As a result, H20 was never commissioned into the Royal Navy. Instead, she and H13, H16, H17, H18, and H19 were transferred to the Chilean Navy as partial recompensation for the appropriation of two 28,000-ton dreadnoughts ( and ). Originally named H6 when turned over to Chile in 1917, she was renamed Fresia in 1924. She served with the Chilean Navy until she was stricken in 1945.

Notes

References

See also
 List of submarines of the Second World War

British H-class submarines
Ships built in Quincy, Massachusetts
1915 ships
World War I submarines of the United Kingdom
British H-class submarines of the Chilean Navy
World War II submarines of Chile